The TSS Duke of Rothesay was a railway steamer passenger ship that operated in Europe from 1956 to 1975.

In service

Along with her sister ships the TSS Duke of Lancaster and the TSS Duke of Argyll she was amongst the last passenger-only steamers built for British Railways (at that time, also a ferry operator). She was a replacement for the 1928 steamer built by the London Midland & Scottish Railway, RMS Duke of Rothesay.

Built at William Denny & Brothers, Dumbarton and completed in 1956, she was designed to operate as both a passenger ferry (primarily on the Heysham-Belfast route) and as a cruise ship.

She provided some relief services between Holyhead and Dún Laoghaire in 1965 and 1966. In March 1967, she was converted to a side loading car ferry by Cammell Laird to be used on the Fishguard to Rosslare service, which continued until the Caledonian Princess took over in 1971. The main deck was gutted and space made for 100 cars.

In October 1975, she was towed from Holyhead to Faslane to scrapped.

References

Passenger ships of the United Kingdom
Ferries of the United Kingdom
1956 ships
Ferries of Wales
Ships of British Rail
Ships built on the River Clyde